Propositions is an album by the Memphis, Tennessee-based funk band The Bar-Kays, released on Mercury Records in November 1982. The album reached number nine on the Billboard R&B albums chart and contained three hits: the uptempo singles "Do It (Let Me See You Shake)" and "She Talks To Me With Her Body", plus the Bar-Kays' most popular ballad "Anticipation".

Track listing
"Propositions" 	5:49 	
"Tripping Out" 	4:54 	
"Anticipation" 	5:46 	
"(Busted)" 	2:05 	
"Do It (Let Me See You Shake)" 	6:02 	
"She Talks To Me With Her Body" 	6:06 	
"I Can't Believe You're Leaving Me" 	4:04 	
"You Made a Change in My Life" 	4:18

Charts

Singles

References

External links
 The Bar-Kays-Propositions at Discogs

1982 albums
Bar-Kays albums
Mercury Records albums